Cube is a Canadian science fiction horror film series. The films were directed by Vincenzo Natali, Andrzej Sekuła, Ernie Barbarash and Yasuhiko Shimizu respectively.

The films are centered, with slight variations, on the same science-fictional setting: a gigantic, mechanized cubical structure of unknown purpose and origin, made up of numerous smaller cubical rooms, in which most or all of the principal characters inexplicably awaken in the opening scenes. Each of these rooms has six heavy vault doors, one on each face of the cube, which lead into adjacent, largely identical rooms, differing occasionally by colour of lighting. Some of these rooms are "safe", while others are equipped with deadly booby traps such as flamethrowers and razorwire. In some cases it is possible to detect a trap by throwing an object into the room first, although this method is not always reliable due to the trigger mechanism of certain traps.

In each case, a group of strangers awakens in this mysterious structure, without any knowledge of how or why they are there. In order to escape from the prison, they must band together and use their combined skills and talents to avoid the traps and navigate out of the maze, while also trying to solve the mystery of what the cube is and why they are in it.

An American remake, currently on hold, is in development at Lionsgate, and a Japanese produced remake was released in 2021.

Setting

Mythology
The world in which the Cube series is set is kept secret from the viewer of the films throughout. The first Cube, in particular, portrays nothing of the world in which the film is set, who is responsible for the Cube, or why the prisoners are there. Hints are, however, given throughout the second and third films. The film's writer, Vincenzo Natali, apparently wrote a script detailing the world outside the Cube, but destroyed it after deciding not to create a movie about it. The plot devices used in Hypercube and Cube Zero (IZON and the government) are likely not (or only very loosely) related to Natali's original idea.

The first film is especially most ominous about the outside world; there is no indication of where or when the Cube was built, nor the timeline of it (although it is generally assumed to be present day). Although the main characters are presumably North American due to their speaking English with typical North American accents, there is no evidence of the Cube built in the U.S. However, in the second film, a U.S. Colonel displays knowledge of the first Cube's existence and layout. The Colonel is referring to the Cube in the first movie and not the prequel because he mentions a feature specific to that Cube.

The second film reveals that a company named IZON is responsible for the Cube. Several exterior shots indicate that it is set in present time. The Cube's disturbing nature and the sheer impossibility of it being a physical construct (since it is technically an endless tesseract) make the location ambiguous. Furthermore, IZON is a private company, but the presence of the aforementioned Colonel and his knowledge of the Cube suggests that the U.S government is involved, or are perhaps trying to take it down.

The third Cube shows its personnel, consisting of management (known as "people upstairs") and technicians who operate the Cube and oversee the people placed inside. All people trapped in the Cube are death row inmates with their memories deleted and who willingly signed in to be placed inside instead of being executed. The Cube appears to be operated by a repressive, totalitarian government. At one point, when one technician finds no consent form of a woman trapped inside, it shows that the government also imprisons political opponents inside against their will (the technician finds her picture in a newspaper showing her at a political protest). It is also revealed in this movie that a character from the first film, Kazan, may not actually be autistic, and was in fact Eric Wynn (or a victim of the same treatment Wynn received: having his brain surgically altered so his behaviour resembles that of a stereotypical autistic savant).

Films

Cube (1997)

Cube, the first film in the series, follows a group of seven frightened strangers who find themselves trapped in a bizarre maze of cubical rooms, with no memory of how they arrived there. Searching for a way out, they soon discover that many rooms contain lethal booby traps, while others are safe. Initially the prisoners band together in an attempt to escape, however one of the prisoners then begins to turn insane and threatens the group’s escape. Despite the film's low budget, it achieved moderate commercial success and has developed a cult following due to its surreal, Kafkaesque setting.

Cube 2: Hypercube (2002)

Cube 2: Hypercube is a sequel to the film Cube. The dusky, dingy rooms of the first film are replaced with high-tech, brightly lit rooms, and the conventional technology of the original traps are replaced with threats based on abstract mathematics. A new group of prisoners quickly discovers that, unlike the original Cube, the rooms in their prison appear to shift instantaneously. They realize they are inside a hypercube in which gravity, space, and time are distorted. This time the prisoners each have a connection to the cube's suggested creator.

Cube Zero (2004)

Cube Zero is a prequel to the film Cube. Unlike the first two films, which were limited to the prisoners' point of view, the film concerns two characters, Eric Wynn and Dodd, who are technicians observing the prisoners. Wynn finds himself caring about the fate of Cassandra Rains, a woman in the Cube, and decides to risk his job and even his life to help her try to escape. The rooms are similar to the original film, except that the colors are not as bright as in the first film.

Cube (2021)

A Japanese remake, also called Cube, was released in October 2021.

Future
In March 2011, it was reported that Lionsgate Films had filmed an additional direct-to-video film in the series, tentatively titled Cube 3D. While filmed, it is considered lost media.

In April 2015, The Hollywood Reporter wrote that Lionsgate Films was planning to remake the film, under the title Cubed, with Saman Kesh directing, Roy Lee and Jon Spaihts producing and a screenplay by Philip Gawthorne, based on Kesh’s original take. Development on the film stalled the following year, leaving its future uncertain.

Cast and crew

Principal cast

Prisoners details in each film

Cube (1997)

Cube 2: Hypercube

Cube Zero

Cube (2021)

See also
 Cinema of Canada
 The Cube

References

External links
 
 
 
 

 
Horror film series
Science fiction film series
Science fiction horror film series
Films about mathematics